Ramada International is the company that owns, operates, and franchises hotels using the Ramada name outside of the United States and Canada.  Ramada International was formerly owned by Marriott International, a competitor of Cendant, which owned Ramada in the United States and Canada.  In 2004, however, Cendant purchased Ramada International from Marriott, which gives Cendant worldwide rights to the Ramada name.  Despite now being under the same ownership, Ramada and Ramada International remained separate entities.  In 2006, the hotels and hospitality divisions of Cendant were spun off into Wyndham Worldwide.

See also 
 Ramada

External links 
 Ramada website
 

Hospitality companies of the United States
Ramada